Admiral Sir John Charles Dalrymple-Hay, 3rd Baronet,  (11 February 1821 – 28 January 1912) was a Royal Navy officer and politician.

Early life
Born in Edinburgh, Hay-Dalrymple was the only child of Sir James Dalrymple Hay, 2nd Baronet, by his first wife Elizabeth, daughter of Lieutenant-General Sir John Shaw Heron-Maxwell, 4th Baronet. His mother died in childbirth. His father remarried in 1823 and had a further eight children. He was educated at Rugby School, and succeeded to the baronetcy on 19 March 1861.

Naval career
Dalrymple-Hay entered the Royal Navy in 1834. During his naval career he was involved in the Sixth Xhosa War in South Africa and the Oriental Crisis in Syria, being present when Beirut and St Jean d'Acre fell. He was also concerned with successful operations against Chinese pirates in the 1840s.

He commanded HMS Victory from 1854 and then commanded HMS Hannibal during the Crimean War and was decorated by the British and Turkish governments. He was promoted to captain in 1850 and commanded HMS Indus from 1856. He was promoted to rear admiral in 1866, before retiring as an admiral in March 1878. He was Fourth Naval Lord from 1866 to 1868.

Following the succession of King Edward VII, he was among several retired admirals advanced to Knight Grand Cross of the Order of the Bath (GCB) in the 1902 Coronation Honours list published on 26 June 1902, and received the insignia in an investiture on board the royal yacht Victoria and Albert outside Cowes on 15 August 1902, the day before the fleet review held there to mark the coronation.

Political career
Dalrymple-Hay was a Conservative politician. He served as member of parliament (MP) for Wakefield 1862–1865. He lost an election at Tiverton on 28 February 1866. He represented Stamford 1866–1880. In 1880-1885 Admiral Hay was the MP for Wigtown Burghs. He was made a privy counsellor in 1874.

Family
Dalrymple-Hay married the Hon. Eliza Napier, daughter of William John Napier, 9th Lord Napier of Merchistoun, in 1847. They had three sons and six daughters. Lady Dalrymple-Hay died in 1901. Dalrymple-Hay survived her by eleven years and died in January 1912, aged 90. He was succeeded in the baronetcy by his second but eldest surviving son, William.

Works

See also

References

External links 
 

|-

1821 births
1912 deaths
Anglo-Scots
Baronets in the Baronetage of Great Britain
Military personnel from Edinburgh
Knights Grand Cross of the Order of the Bath
Lords of the Admiralty
Members of the Privy Council of the United Kingdom
Royal Navy admirals
Scottish admirals
Scottish Tory MPs (pre-1912)
Royal Navy personnel of the Crimean War
Conservative Party (UK) MPs for English constituencies
Members of the Parliament of the United Kingdom for Scottish constituencies
UK MPs 1859–1865
UK MPs 1865–1868
UK MPs 1868–1874
UK MPs 1874–1880
UK MPs 1880–1885
Royal Navy personnel of the Egyptian–Ottoman War (1839–1841)
Fellows of the Royal Society
Politics of Wakefield
Politicians from Edinburgh